Scott Williams (born 18 January 1990) is a professional English darts player, who currently plays in Professional Darts Corporation (PDC) and World Darts Federation (WDF) events. He was the third player to win a Professional Darts Corporation ranking title without being a tour card holder.

Career
In October 2019, he qualified for the 2020 BDO World Darts Championship as one of the Playoff Qualifiers, he defeated Wes Newton and Andrew Kateley to secure his place in the tournament. He played Justin Thompson in the preliminary round.

Williams won his first PDC title, when he triumphed on the first tournament of PDC Challenge Tour 2022, in Milton Keynes. He saw off Robert Owen in the final 5-2 with an 88 average after previously averaging ten points more to see off Danny Lauby. He also defeated Darren Johnson, Darryl Pilgrim and Conor Heneghan among others en route to the title. On the very same day, he got his second title in the event 02. Williams saw off Lee Evans 5-2 in the final with a 95 average and won both titles with a 100 checkout.

Williams won the 17th tournament of the 2022 PDC Players Championship series in June, beating Nathan Aspinall in the final, becoming the third player, after Joe Murnan and Krzysztof Ratajski, to win a Professional Darts Corporation ranking title without being a full tour card holder.

At the end of September 2022, he was selected by the national federation to participate in the 2022 WDF Europe Cup. On the second day of the tournament, he advanced to the finals of the pairs competition where he played together with Joshua Richardson. On the way to the final, they defeated rivals from Wales, Romania and Czech Republic. Finally, on October 1, they beat Poland pairs Sebastian Białecki and Dariusz Marciniak by 6–2 in legs. On the third day of the tournament, he advanced to the fifth round of the singles competition, surprisingly lost by 1–4 in legs to Jan McIntosh, who played on an average of 103.90. In the team competition, together with the team, he won the gold medal. In the points classification, as a representative of England, he also contributed to won a gold medal.

World Championship results

BDO
 2020: Preliminary round (lost to Justin Thompson 0–3)

PDC
 2023: Second round (lost to Rob Cross 1–3)

Performance timeline

PDC European Tour

References

Living people
English darts players
People educated at Boston Grammar School
1990 births
People from Westminster
PDC ranking title winners
Professional Darts Corporation associate players